St. James Episcopal Church Lafayette Square, or St. James African Episcopal Church, founded in 1824, is a historic Episcopal church now located at 1024 W. Lafayette Avenue in the Lafayette Square Historic District of Baltimore, Maryland.

In 2020, it reported 432 members, 95 average attendance, and plate and pledge income of $317,553.

History 
The historically African-American parish, the first Colored Episcopal Mission south of the Mason–Dixon line, was first organized and Rev. William Levington held its first service in an "Upper Room" at Park Avenue and Marion Street on June 23, 1824. Only St. Philips Episcopal Church in New York and St. Thomas Church in Philadelphia (where Rev. Levington was ordained) are older. The congregation moved several times under Rev. Levington, building a new church at North (now Guilford) and Saratoga Streets, which was dedicated on March 31, 1827. After his death, the congregation had a series of white ministers and lost its status as an independent parish.

Rev. George Freeman Bragg, a historian of early African Episcopal congregations, became the congregation's rector in 1891 (by which time it had moved to Lexington and High Streets). He served 49 years until his death in 1940. In 1901 the congregation had grown such that they built and consecrated a new building at Park Avenue and Preston Street. By 1924 this parish was among the largest Black Episcopalian congregations in the country, with more than 500 parishioners. On Easter, 1932, the congregation held their first services in the current building, which it had bought from the white congregation, Church of the Ascension, which had moved to Middle River, Maryland.

Rev. Donald Wilson served as rector from 1963 until his retirement in 1986, and oversaw significant changes in the neighborhood surrounding the parish. Under his leadership, the parish invested in the surrounding neighborhood, building the St. James Terrace Apartments in 1968.

In 1993, lightning struck the church and destroyed the rose window, among other significant damage, but Bishop Charles L. Longest reconsecrated the building on June 11, 1995. The congregation's next rector, Michael Bruce Curry (1988-2000), resigned to become Bishop of Episcopal Diocese of North Carolina. On May 1, 2015, the joint nominating committee for the election of the presiding bishop of the Episcopal Church nominated Curry and three other bishops as candidates for 27th presiding bishop and primate of the Episcopal Church. The election occurred on June 27, 2015, at the 78th General Convention meeting in Salt Lake City. Curry was elected by the House of Bishops, meeting in St. Mark's Cathedral, on the first ballot with 121 of 174 votes cast. Laity and clergy in the House of Deputies ratified Curry's election later the same day. Curry was installed as presiding bishop and primate on November 1, 2015, All Saints' Day, during a Eucharist at Washington National Cathedral. The service included readings in Spanish and Native American languages.

The next rector, Allen F. Robinson, served from 2002 to 2017. In 2008, the parish hosted the diocesan convention which elected Eugene Sutton as the first African American to become Bishop of the Diocese of Maryland.

The current Rector is The. Rev. Richard D. Meadows, Jr.  he has served as Priest-in-Charge since July 2018 and was elected Rector January 23, 2022.

The African American Rectors of St. James

1824   The Rev. William Levington

1957   The Rev. Harrison H. Webb

1891   The Rev. George F. Bragg

1940   The Rev. Cedric Mills

1963   The Rev. Donald O. Wilson

1988   The Rev. Michael B. Curry

2002   The Rev. Allen F. Robinson

2022   The Rev. Richard Dean Meadows, Jr.

Architecture
According to the Maryland historic buildings survey, noteworthy features of this stone building include the stepped buttresses, pointed-arch entrances in the center and right, together with their stone hoods, the tower which suggests an Italian Romanesque campanile, the small ascending pointed windows including the bulls-eye window at the second level and the rose window above the entrance.

References

Episcopal church building in Baltimore
Christianity and race
History of racial segregation in the United States
African-American segregation in the United States
Episcopal Church (United States)
African-American historic places
Episcopal church buildings in Maryland
African-American history in Baltimore
Sandtown-Winchester, Baltimore